Lambula melaleuca is a moth of the family Erebidae. It was described by Francis Walker in 1866. It is found on the Moluccas. It is the type species of the genus Lambula.

References

 

Lithosiina
Moths described in 1866